Leisure is a 1976 Australian animated short film directed by Bruce Petty. The film won the Academy Award for Best Animated Short Film at the 49th Academy Awards.

It is also one of the few Australian animated films to win such an honor (2003's Harvie Krumpet and 2010's The Lost Thing).

References

External links
 
 , posted by the National Film and Sound Archive
 

1976 short films
1976 animated films
1970s animated short films
Australian animated short films
Best Animated Short Academy Award winners
1970s English-language films
1970s Australian animated films
1970s Australian films